The World Group Play-offs were four ties which involved the losing nations of the World Group first round and the winning nations of the World Group II. Nations that won their play-off ties entered the 2014 World Group, while losing nations joined the 2014 World Group II.

Germany vs. Serbia

Switzerland vs. Australia

Spain vs. Japan

United States vs. Sweden

References 

World Group Play-offs